3150 may refer to:

In general
 A.D. 3150, a year in the 4th millennium CE
 3150 BC, a year in the 4th millennium BCE
 3150, a number in the 3000 (number) range

Roads numbered 3150
 Hawaii Route 3150, a state highway
 Texas Farm to Market Road 3150, a state highway
 Malaysia Federal Route 3150, a highway in Ipoh

Rail
 CP Class 3150, an electric multiple unit train class
 Euskotren 3150 series, a railcar class
 GWR 3150 Class, a side tank steam locomotive class
 Meitetsu 3150 series, an electric multiple unit train class

Other uses
 3150 Tosa, an asteroid in the Asteroid Belt, the 3150th asteroid registered
 CDC 3150, a CDC 3000 series minicomputer

See also